Werner Lott (3 December 1907 – 2 May 1997) was a German U-boat commander in World War II.

He was famously known for his humanity and being responsible for saving the lives of 28 Greek sailors whose ship he torpedoed; his submarine  rescued the sailors who were treated with the utmost decency and landed them safely on a Kerry beach in what was one of only two such instances when a German submarine crew risked its own safety to protect the crew of a vessel they torpedoed and sank.

Another incident involving Lott happened while a prisoner of war in the Tower of London. He complained about the accommodations, and asked to talk to the officer in charge. Instead, he was visited by Lord Louis Mountbatten, the commander of the flotilla that sank his submarine, who arranged for the Admiralty to allow Lott and his second-in-command to dine at Scott's restaurant on the condition they not try to escape. Lott kept his promise, and was returned to the Tower later that night. A few days later, he and the other officers were moved to the Grizedale P.O.W. camp. Later, the entire crew was moved to P.O.W. camps in Canada.

In 1984 he visited the Kerry man, Jimmy Fenton, who catered for the Greek sailors and posed for a photograph shaking his hand.

References

Bibliography

External links

1907 births
1997 deaths
People from East Prussia
German prisoners of war in World War II held by the United Kingdom
Recipients of the Iron Cross (1939), 2nd class
U-boat commanders (Kriegsmarine)
Reichsmarine personnel